The Suseni (in its upper course also: Surlău) is a right tributary of the river Șușița in Romania. It discharges into the Șușița in Ursați.

Tributaries

The following rivers are tributaries to the river Suseni (from source to mouth):

Left: Scărișoara, Scoaba Tinicioara
Right: Pârâul Bogat, Scoaba Alunoasă, Igirosu, Valea Seacă, Clențu

References

Rivers of Romania
Rivers of Gorj County